Bobirjon Akbarov (Uzbek Cyrillic: Бобиржон Акбаров; born 14 February 1989) is an Uzbek footballer who plays for Kokand as a centre-back.

Career statistics

Club

References

External links

1989 births
Living people
Uzbekistani footballers
Uzbekistani expatriate footballers
Association football defenders
Navbahor Namangan players
FC Bunyodkor players
Kuala Lumpur City F.C. players
FK Andijon players
Uzbekistan Super League players
Malaysia Super League players
Expatriate footballers in Malaysia
Uzbekistani expatriate sportspeople in Malaysia